Ignatovskaya is a rural locality (a village) in Nizhneslobodskoye Rural Settlement, Vozhegodsky District, Vologda Oblast, Russia. The population was 24 as of 2002.

Geography 
Ignatovskaya is located 51 km east of Vozhega (the district's administrative centre) by road. Zasukhonskaya is the nearest rural locality.

References 

Rural localities in Vozhegodsky District